Nihad Awad (Arabic: نهاد عوض) is the co-founder and Executive Director of the Council on American-Islamic Relations (CAIR).

Early life 
Nihad Awad was born in Amman New Camp, a Palestinian refugee camp in Amman, Jordan. He studied at Second Amman Preparatory School for Boys, located at the camp and belongs to UNRWA, and at Salaheddine High School in Achrafieh in Jordan. He moved to Italy and later to the United States to pursue his university studies.

Career 
After studying civil engineering at the University of Minnesota in the 1990s, he worked at the University of Minnesota Medical Center. After the Gulf War, he was Public Relations Director for the Islamic Association for Palestine (IAP).

In June 1994, IAP President Omar Ahmad and Rafiq Jabir founded the Council on American-Islamic Relations (CAIR), and Awad was hired as the Executive Director.  In a March 1994 speech at Barry University, future CAIR Executive Director Awad said in response to an audience question about the various humanitarian efforts in the Palestinian Occupied Territories, "I am in support of the Hamas movement more than the PLO... there are some [Hamas] radicals, we are not interested in those people." At the time Awad expressed support for Hamas, the group had not conducted suicide bombings and was not designated a terrorist organization by the US. Awad has said he no longer supports the group and has condemned suicide bombings.

A few days after the September 11 attacks in 2001, Awad was one of a select group American Muslim leaders invited by the White House to join President Bush in a press conference condemning the attacks and acts of anti-Muslim intolerance that followed.

Controversies

Fundraising Request to Muammar Gaddafi
In April 2011, Rep. Frank Wolf, R-Va. cited a 2009 letter sent from Awad, to Muammar Gaddafi asking Gaddafi for funding for a project called the Muslim Peace Foundation at a U.S. House of Representatives Appropriations sub-committee hearing with Robert Mueller. The letter also said, in part, "I am pleased to send to Your Excellency in my name most solemn assurances of thanks and appreciation for the efforts you exert in the service of Islam, Muslims and all mankind through your initiative to teach Islam, spread the culture of Islam, and solve disputes, for which you are known internationally."

Awards & honors

 The Royal Islamic Strategic Studies Centre's "500 Most Influential Muslims 2009"
 Among 100 of the "World's Most Influential Arabs" for 2010 by Arabian Business magazine
 Recipient of the Phillip Brooks House Association's Robert Coles Call of Service & Lecture Award at Harvard College in 2017. 
 Listed Among "19 of the Most Important Civil Rights Leaders of Today" by USA Today in 2020.

References

External links
 Official website
 

Living people
Palestinian Muslims
Palestinian Sunni Muslims
American Muslims
American Sunni Muslims
Palestinian emigrants to the United States
University of Minnesota College of Science and Engineering alumni
University of Minnesota faculty
People from Amman
Palestinian Muslim activists
American Muslim activists
Year of birth missing (living people)